Antics in the Forbidden Zone is a Greatest Hits compilation and accompanying video by the English new wave musician Adam Ant, released 23 October 1990 by Epic Records. The collection spans the years 1979 to 1985, including Ant's time as frontman of Adam and the Ants with selections from Dirk Wears White Sox (1979), Kings of the Wild Frontier (1980), and Prince Charming (1981), as well as his first three solo albums, Friend or Foe (1982), Strip (1983) and Vive Le Rock (1985). The collection does not include "Ants Invasion," from which the title Antics in the Forbidden Zone was taken.

Video
The video release, published by Sony Music Distribution, collects twelve music videos both from the band and from Ant's solo career. Missing are early videos prior to Adam and the Ant's signing to Epic ("Zerox," for example) and "Dog Eat Dog." In the case of "Dog Eat Dog," concert footage was used rather than the Top of the Pops performance from 16 October 1980 that had been licensed to CBS, and had been used as the official music video up to that point.

Reception 

Chris Woodstra of Allmusic gave Antics in the Forbidden Zone four and a half stars out of five, praising it as "the most comprehensive overview of the band" and "an essential part of any new wave collection". He also remarked of the video release that "These groundbreaking videos, while primitive by today's standards, were as important to this band's success as was the music."

Track listing 
It includes all of the singles from these releases along with additional selections from each album. "Beat My Guest'", a song previously released as the B-side to "Stand and Deliver," makes its first appearance on CD. Though usually stylised as one word, "Car Trouble" is separated into two words on this collection.

Personnel 
Adam Ant – vocals, guitar, piano, harmonica, bass guitar
Matthew Ashman – guitar, piano (tracks 1–4)
Dave Barbarossa – percussion (tracks 1 & 2)
Jon Moss - Drums (tracks 3 & 4)
Andrew Warren – bass guitar (tracks 1–4)
Marco Pirroni – guitar (tracks 5–21)
Kevin Mooney – bass guitar (tracks 5–9)
Chris Hughes – drums (tracks 3–13)
Terry Lee Miall – drums (tracks 5–13)
Gary Tibbs – bass guitar (tracks 10–13)
Bogdan Wiczling – drums, percussion (tracks 14–17, 20 & 21)
Martin Drover – trumpet, flugelhorn (tracks 14–17)
Jeff Daly – saxophone (tracks 14–17)
Phil Collins – drums (tracks 18 & 19)
Anni-Frid Lyngstad – female vocals (track 18)
Chris Constantinou – bass guitar, backing vocals (tracks 20 & 21)

References 

Adam Ant albums
1990 compilation albums
1990 video albums
Epic Records compilation albums